Shine is a surname. Notable people with the surname include:

 Abrid Shine, Indian film director, screenwriter and fashion photographer in the Malayalam film industry
 Betty Shine, (1929–2002), English author, opera singer and spiritualist
 Bill Shine (born 1963), former White House Communications Director under President Donald Trump
 Bill Shine (actor) (born 1911), British theatre, film and television actor
 Brad Shine (born 1959), former Australian rules football player
 Brendan Shine (born 1947), Irish folk and country singer, television presenter and accordion player from Athlone
 Clare Shine (born 1995), Irish international footballer who plays for SWPL club Glasgow City
 DJ Shine (born 1974), stage name of Lim Byung-wook, a Korean Rapper, Producer, DJ formerly associated with popular Korean hip hop group, Drunken Tiger
 Donal Shine (born 1989), Gaelic footballer
 Fabienne Shine (born 1944), French and Jewish model, actress and musician
 John Shine (born 1946), Australian biochemist
 Keith Shine (born 1958), Regius Professor of Meteorology and Climate Science at the University of Reading
 Ken Shine (born 1947), Australian rugby league coach
 Kevin Shine (born 1969), former first-class cricketer and former coach of Somerset County Cricket Club
 Kia Shine (born 1980), stage name of Nakia Shine Coleman, an American hip hop recording artist and producer from Memphis
 Michael Shine (born 1953), former United States Olympic athlete
 Pat Shine (fl. 2000s), American baseball coach
 Richard Shine (born 1950), Australian evolutionary biologist and ecologist
 Tara Shine, Irish environmental scientist, policy advisor and science communicator
 Thomas Shine (1872–1955), Irish Roman Catholic bishop
 Wilfred Shine (1864–1939), British actor and a specialist in melodrama

See also
Shine (disambiguation)
Shines, a surname